Serge Bramly (born 31 January 1949 in Tunis, Tunisia) is a French-language writer and essayist.

Biography
He was born into a Jewish family in Tunis, Tunisia. When he was ten years old, his family emigrated to France.  He was married to photographer Bettina Rheims, with whom he has collaborated frequently, and had a son, Virgile.
His novel  was adapted by Benoît Jacquot for the 2000 French film Sade. He is also noted for his books on Leonardo da Vinci and the Mona Lisa--Leonardo: Discovering the Life of Leonardo da Vinci, 1991 Leonardo: The Artist and the Man (1995), and Mona Lisa: The Enigma (2005). In 2008 he won the prix Interallié for his novel Le Premier Principe - Le Second Principe.

Bibliography
 Terre Wakan, Robert Laffont, essay 1974
 Macumba, forces noires du Brésil, essay. Seghers, 1975, Editions Albin Michel, 1981
 Rudolf Steiner: prophète de l'homme nouveau, Retz, 1976, 
 L'Itinéraire du fou, Flammarion, 1978
 Un Piège à Lumière, Flammarion, 1979, 
 Man Ray, essay. Pierre Belfond, 1980
  Le livre des dates, essay, Ramsay, 1981
 La Danse du loup, Belfond, 1982,
 Léonard de Vinci, éditions Lattès, 1988, 
 Le Grand cheval de Léonard : le projet monumental de Léonard de Vinci, Adam Biro, 1990, 
 Terre sacrée, Editions Albin Michel, 1992
 Madame Satan, Grasset, 1992, 
 Walter Carone Photographe, Lattès, 1992, 
 La Terreur dans le boudoir, Grasset, 1994,  screen adaptation by Benoît Jacquot in 2001
 Le Réseau Melchior, Lattès, 1996, 
 Anonym, Kehayoff, Munich, 1996,  (in German, Forward translated by Marietta Piekenbrock)
 INRI, texte de Bramly, photographs by Bettina Rheims, éditions Monacelli Press, 2000, 
 Ragots, Plon, 2001, 
 Shanghai, Laffont, 2003, text by Bramly, photographs by Bettina Rheims, 
 Le Premier Principe - Le Second Principe, éditions Lattès, 2008, Prix Interallié,

References

External link

1949 births
Living people
Writers from Tunis
20th-century French novelists
20th-century French male writers
21st-century French novelists
Prix Interallié winners
Prix des libraires winners
French male novelists
21st-century French male writers